The 12031 / 32 New Delhi–Amritsar Shatabdi Express is a Superfast Express train of the Shatabdi category belonging to Indian Railways – Northern Railway zone that runs between  and  in India.

It operates as train number 12031 from New Delhi to Amritsar Junction and as train number 12032 in the reverse direction, serving the states of Delhi, Haryana and Punjab.

Coaches

The 12031 / 32 New Delhi–Amritsar Shatabdi Express has 1 Anubhuti Class, 1 Executive Class, 14 AC Chair Car & 2 End-on Generator coaches. It does not carry a pantry car but being a Shatabdi-category train, catering is arranged on board the train.

As is customary with most train services in India, coach composition may be amended at the discretion of Indian Railways depending on demand.

The coaches in Light blue color indicate AC Chair Cars and the coaches in Violet color indicate Executive and Anubhuti Classes.

Service

The 12031 New Delhi–Amritsar Shatabdi Express covers the distance of 448 kilometres in 6 hours 15 mins (71.68 km/hr) & in 6 hours 10 mins as 12032 Amritsar–New Delhi Shatabdi Express (72.65 km/hr).

As the average speed of the train is above , as per Indian Railways rules, its fare includes a Superfast surcharge.

Routeing

Traction

As the entire route is fully electrified, a Ghaziabad-based WAP-5 or WAP-7 powers the train for its entire journey.

Timings

References 

 https://web.archive.org/web/20130723014914/http://www.indianrail.gov.in/shatabdi_trn_list.html
 http://www.nr.indianrailways.gov.in/view_detail.jsp?lang=0&dcd=2705&id=0,4,268

External links

Shatabdi Express trains
Rail transport in Delhi
Rail transport in Haryana
Rail transport in Punjab, India
Transport in Delhi
Transport in Amritsar